Assulella is a genus of moths belonging to the subfamily Olethreutinae of the family Tortricidae.

Species
Assulella anoechtotera Diakonoff, 1983
Assulella archaea Diakonoff, 1983
Assulella kuznetsovi Diakonoff, 1983

See also
List of Tortricidae genera

References

External links
tortricidae.com

Eucosmini
Tortricidae genera